The HIW VSK was a carbine of German origin developed by Hessische Industrie Werke. It was intended as a Volkssturm weapon and used blow forward operation.

Variants

Battle rifle
Chambered for the 8×57 IS rifle round. It used standard 5-round stripper clips to fill the internal magazine.  The barrel is moved forward by a manual bolt action and the action.

Carbine
Chambered for the 8×33 Polte round. It used special 5-round stripper clips to fill the internal magazine. The barrel is blown forward by drag of the bullet and propellant gasses and returns under spring pressure, chambering a new cartridge.

References

7.92×57mm Mauser battle rifles
Blow forward firearms
Carbines
Research and development in Nazi Germany
Rifles of Germany
World War II infantry weapons of Germany

Weapons and ammunition introduced in 1944